Nemacheilus inglisi  is a species of ray-finned fish in the genus Nemacheilus from India.

References

L
Fish described in 1990